Salih Ada (anciently, Taramptos and Caryanda) is a Turkish island in the Aegean Sea, located north of Bodrum. It is located in the Muğla Province. It is located across Güvercinlik Bay on the Muğla-Bodrum highway. Salih Ada is a popular tourist destination, and is accessible by boat from Bodrum. The hills to the east of the island are covered with pine forest and olive groves.

The original location of the town of Caryanda was on this island before its relocation to the mainland. Under the name Taramptos, it was a member of the Delian League and is mentioned in a tribute decree of ancient Athens dated to 425/4 BCE. It is also mentioned in an inscription recovered at Halicarnassus dated to 300 BCE.

References

Islands of Turkey
Islands of Muğla Province
Members of the Delian League
Ancient Greek archaeological sites in Turkey